Have It All  is the first solo album by the American singer-songwriter AJ McLean of the Backstreet Boys. The album was released on January 20, 2010.

Background
The album is McLean's first as a solo artist, although he once toured on his own as alter-ego Johnny No Name. McLean describes Have It All as "something fans of the Backstreet Boys will take notice of, thanks to its slightly risqué vibe". For the album, McLean worked with a number of hitmakers like Kristian Lundin and Dan Muckala. "It's kind of a cross between a little bit of rock and funk and a little bit of dance," McLean said of the album. "It's a well-rounded record. I'm really proud of it and I've been working on it for almost five years. It's going to be a great, great record." McLean released a single from the album, "Teenage Wildlife", with a video directed by Wade Robson.

Recording
The bulk of the album was recorded with songwriters and producers Kristian Lundin and Dan Muckala. Lundin had previously worked with the Backstreet Boys on some of their highest-charting songs, including "Quit Playing Games (with My Heart)", while Muckala had also previously worked with the band on all three of their albums since their reformation in 2005. McLean revealed that one of the first tracks to be written for the album was "London", although the chorus for the track was not added until many months after initial conception, after McLean was inspired following a visit to the city. Much of the material composed with Lundin was also co-written by Lundin's long-time writing partner Carl Falk, who had also worked with the Backstreet Boys. JC Chasez, member of rival boyband NSYNC, composed the album's lead single, "Teenage Wildlife", alongside Jimmy Harry and Simon Wilcox. Chasez revealed in the behind-the-scenes video to accompany the official music video that he had written Teenage Wildlife many years previously and had been waiting to find the right artist to perform it. When he heard that McLean was writing an album, he offered the track to McLean and he loved it on the first listen. McLean also wrote a track with producer Mark Hudson, the only track on the album not to have production or a co-writing credit from Lundin, Muckala or Chasez.

Track listing

Personnel
 Jon Bradley – trumpet 
 Mike Briones – trombone 
 Chuck Butler – bass and acoustic guitar 
 JC Chasez – backing vocals , drums 
 Tom Coyne – mastering
 Dorian Crozier – engineer and drums 
 Mike Davis – trombone 
 John Deley – keyboards 
 Dan Deurloo – assistant engineer 
 Sami Diament – engineer, percussion, and synthesizer 
 Jimmy Emerzian – tenor saxophone , alto and baritone saxophones 
 Carl Falk – engineer, mixing, keyboards, and programming ; guitar ; horn engineer 
 Richard Fortus – guitar 
 Chris Fudurich – engineer 
 Jimmy Harry – engineer, bass, guitar, and keyboards 
 Mark Hudson – bass and guitar 
 Adam Lester – electric guitar 
 Kristian Lundin – engineer, mixing, keyboards, and programming ; horn engineer 
 Jeremy Lutito – drums 
 David Maurice – engineer, mixing, and bass 
 AJ McLean – vocals, guitar , drums and keyboards 
 Dan Muckala – engineer, mixing, instruments, and programming 
 Brian Paturalski – mixing 
 Kent Smith – trumpet 
 Andy Snitzer – saxophone 
 Rami Yacoub – engineer, mixing, keyboards, and programming

Charts

References

2010 debut albums
Avex Group albums